Kobyla Góra  is a village in Ostrzeszów County, Greater Poland Voivodeship, in west-central Poland. It is the seat of the gmina (administrative district) called Gmina Kobyla Góra.

The village has an approximate population of 2,000.

References

Villages in Ostrzeszów County